Karina Pētersone (born 19 September 1954 in Riga, Latvia) is a Latvian politician. She was the Minister of Culture of Latvia from 26 November 1998 to 7 November 2002. She is now a member of the LPP/LC and a deputy of the 9th Saeima (Latvian Parliament). She began her current term in parliament on 7 November 2006.  Currently Director of Support Foundation of the Latvian National Library

References

External links

Saeima website

1954 births
Living people
Politicians from Riga
Latvian Way politicians
Latvia's First Party/Latvian Way politicians
Ministers of Culture of Latvia
Deputies of the 7th Saeima
Deputies of the 9th Saeima
Women deputies of the Saeima
Women government ministers of Latvia
21st-century Latvian women politicians
University of Latvia alumni
Academic staff of the University of Latvia
Academic staff of Riga Technical University